Gehyra serraticauda is a species of gecko endemic to Western New Guinea in Indonesia.

References

Gehyra
Reptiles described in 2014